The Col du Ballon d'Alsace  is a mountain pass situated close to the summit of the Ballon d'Alsace in the Vosges Mountains of France. It connects Saint-Maurice-sur-Moselle (Vosges) with Masevaux (Haut-Rhin) and Belfort.

The Ballon d'Alsace was the first official mountain climb in the Tour de France on 11 July 1905 although the tour had crossed the slightly lower Col de la République in each of the previous two years. The first rider to the top of the Ballon was René Pottier, with the stage being won by Hippolyte Aucouturier. Stage 9 of the 2005 Tour crossed this pass on the centenary of the original climb.

Details of the climbs
The "historic" ascent, as used in the early Tours de France, is from  Saint-Maurice-sur-Moselle (north). From here, the  ascent is 9.0 km long climbing 619 m at an average of 6.9%.

From the south, the climb starts at Malvaux, 4.5 km north of Giromagny. The climb is 12.4 km long, gaining 643 m at an average of 5.2%.

From Sewen (east), the climb is 13.2 km long, at an average of 5.1%, gaining 678 m in height. This climb starts on the D466 and joins the route from the south after 10 km, at the col du Langenberg. The middle section (between 4 and 9 km) is steep, in excess of 8%.

Tour de France
The Ballon d'Alsace was first crossed by the Tour de France on the second stage of the 1905 tour, from Nancy to Dijon. In the first two Tours de France, the cycle race had crossed the Col de la République south of Saint-Etienne. Following violent incidents at the Col de la République in 1904,  the tour's organiser Henri Desgrange decided to look elsewhere for challenges for the riders and at the same time gain publicity for the tour and distract the public from the cheating that had taken place in 1904.

Although only 17 metres higher than the Col de la République, the climb to the Ballon d'Alsace was steeper and Desgrange declared that no cyclist would be able to ride over it. Despite Desgrange's "over-dramatic" concerns, René Pottier crossed the summit first by riding all the way to the top and, although he was passed by Hippolyte Aucouturier before the finish at Besançon, Pottier became the leader of the tour. Unfortunately, the pace of his ascent exacerbated injuries that he had sustained in a fall on Stage 1, and  Pottier was forced to withdraw from the race the next day. Following the 1905 tour's successful passage over the Ballon d'Alsace, Desgrange declared:the ascent of the Ballon d'Alsace ... was one of the most thrilling sights I have ever witnessed, and confirms my opinion that man's courage knows no limits and a highly trained athlete can aspire to remarkable performances.

Thus was the myth born that the Col d'Alsace was the first mountain crossing in the history of the Tour de France, which is still maintained in the Tour's official history.

The Tour returned to the Ballon d'Alsace the following year and  Pottier was again the first rider over the summit. He arrived at  Saint-Maurice-sur-Moselle in a group of 19 riders: according to L'Auto: "At the foot of the climb, Pottier bolted, as if the bell had sounded the final lap of a track race. He hadn't reached the first hairpin before the group was torn apart." The other riders soon dropped away with only Augustin Ringeval able to briefly keep in contact with Pottier although even he was dropped well before the summit: Pottier and Ringeval are alone now. A brief but terrifying duel breaks out, until, making a final demand from his boundless reserves, the leader pulls away into the teeth of the gradient. Ringeval loses ground, makes it up again with a magnificent effort, then drops back again, done for!  
Pottier crossed the summit alone, over four minutes ahead of the next rider and maintained his lead into the stage finish at Dijon, going on to win the whole race in Paris three weeks later. 
Those of us who witnessed his interminable, solitary, high-speed ride were left wondering whether it had not all been a dream, and asking ourselves what mysterious force it is that possesses the human organism and allows it to push back the boundaries of the possible. 

Pottier was found hanged at his home the following January, having committed suicide. Following his death, a monument to him was erected at the summit of the Col du Ballon d'Alsace.

Passages in the Tour de France
The Tour de France crossed over the Col du Ballon d'Alsace every year between 1905 and 1914, and then five times in the 1930s. Since World War II, the crossings have been less frequent, with the most recent being in 2005 to commemorate the 100th anniversary of the first passage. The tour has crossed the mountain twenty-one times in its history.

Notes

Tour de France stage finishes 
Between 1967 and 1979, the tour had four mountain top finishes at the summit of the Col du Ballon d'Alsace.

Tour de France Femmes
The col was crossed on Stage 8 of the 2022 Tour de France Femmes.

Amateur cycling
The Col du Ballon d'Alsace is also used by amateur cyclists on the "Trois Ballons" sportive ride held in June (together with the climbs over the Grand Ballon and the Ballon de Servance).

Gallery

See also
 List of highest paved roads in Europe
 List of mountain passes

References

External links
 
Details of the climbs on  www.cycling-challenge.com
Ballon d'Alsace on Google Maps (Tour de France classic climbs)

Transport in Grand Est
Mountain passes of Grand Est
Mountain passes of the Vosges